Claude Lefebvre may refer to:

Claude Lefèbvre (1633–1675), French painter and engraver
Claude Lefebvre (handballer) (born 1952), Canadian handball player 
Claude Lefebvre (ice hockey) (born 1964), Canadian ice hockey player and coach 
Claude Lefebvre (politician) (1929–2016), Canadian municipal politician
Claude Lefebvre (composer) (1930-2012), French composer (:fr:Claude Lefebvre)